The Widener University Observatory is an astronomical observatory owned and operated by Widener University, but donated by NASA.  It is located in Kirkbride Hall on Widener's main campus in Chester, Pennsylvania.  The observatory is intended for student use and research within the physics and astronomy department.  In addition, public viewing sessions occur throughout the year that are opened to the surrounding community.

The observatory includes a 20.5 foot ASH dome housing a 16" LX200GPS SCT Meade telescope.  Four smaller 12" LX200GPS Meade telescopes are used on two observation decks. (See Meade LX200)

See also 
List of astronomical observatories

References 
 

Astronomical observatories in Pennsylvania
Observatory